Coffin races or coffin racing is a sport in which the contestants compete in delivering a coffin from start to finish; rules may vary.

Emma Crawford Coffin Memorial Races
The town of Manitou Springs Colorado, USA decided "to put 'fun' into funeral" in 1994 while looking for ideas to boost tourism. The Emma Crawford Memorial Coffin Races were based on a local story of Emma Crawford, who wished to be buried at the top of Red Mountain. Her remains were later reburied on a slope due to construction by Louisville and Nashville Railroad Company. The slope eroded over time exposing the coffin which slid down into the canyon, where it was found and reburied at the Crystal Valley Cemetery. The Races are a full day event during the weekend close to Halloween, which, in part, includes the Emma Crawford Parade. The race itself involves a team of five: Emma and four "mourners", all costumed, who have to push their coffin 195 yards to the finish. The teams race in pairs down the street. In addition to 'Coffin Race Winner', participants are awarded for 'Best Emma', 'Best Entourage', and 'Best Coffin' during the Parade.  In 2017, The Resurrection transpired and teams were also given the opportunity to compete for the vaunted Coffin Cup.

Other places
The Frozen Dead Guy Days festival in Nederland, Colorado has been held in spring since 2002. In addition to coffin races, there are other unusual sports and contests, including turkey bowling, frozen salmon toss, Snowy Human Foosball, and frozen T-shirt and brain freeze contests.

Since October 2012, coffin races are part of the Denton's Days of The Dead Festival in Denton, Texas.

In Napa Valley, the Coffin Races, called "Rattled but not Shaken" are organized by the Napa City Firefighters Association. In 2015 there were four divisions: 5 to 15 years, Goblins; 15 to 30 years, Speed Demons; 30 years and over, Crypt Keepers, and a Women's division, Sirens.

In Gardnerville, Nevada the coffin races are called "Slaughterhouse Lane Coffin Race". It is held the second weekend of October and is organized by the Main Street Gardnerville program and its many volunteers. Halloweened themed vendors and activities throughout the day. You can find more information on the Main Street Gardnerville website calendar.

The Coffin Cup 

"12 Years ago, the Mani-Tu-Tu's took the Coffin Cup to Nederland's Frozen Dead Guy Days. The years went by...."  In 2017, the Cup was Resurrected and at the 2017 Emma Crawford Coffin Race in Manitou Springs, Colorado, Team Fossil won The Coffin Cup and privilege of representing Manitou Springs at the 2018 Frozen Dead Guy Days coffin race in Nederland, CO.  That would become the epic first Coffin Cup defense of the renewed coffin racing rivalry between the two Front Range towns.

The Coffin Cup is the travelling trophy given to the winner of the epic throw-down between Emma Crawford Coffin Racing teams in Manitou Springs and Frozen Dead Guy Days in Nederland, CO.  The winner of the most recent event keeps The Coffin Cup for their team and town, bringing it out for a defense against the challengers when coffin racers meet again for the next semi-annual show-down.  Traditionally, the winning team is encouraged to parade around with The Coffin Cup held high over their heads, lowering it only to take a swig of the Victory Ale that flows easily, like the cool tears of their departed foes, from The Cup.  Festival and race revelers are encouraged to bask in the glory of the winning team, cheering them on everywhere they go and sharing in a victory that only the elite few get to experience.  Traditions may vary by team.

Coffin Cup Controversy 
The Coffin Cup awards have not been without controversy.  In 2017, Team Fossil was awarded The Coffin Cup despite being recorded with only the 4th best time by the (anecdotally imprecise) Emma Crawford Coffin Race timing system.  The team with the fastest time, "The Office", as well as the following two teams were not awarded The Coffin Cup because they did not give their consent prior to the race as was required.  Regardless of the controversial nomination, Team Fossil proved their worthiness and speed in Nederland that year by clocking the fastest time of the day (38.35 seconds) and successfully defending The Coffin Cup from the Nederland challengers.

Past Coffin Cup Winners

References

Sports entertainment
Humour
Racing
Coffins